Albești is a commune in Botoșani County, Western Moldavia, Romania. It is composed of six villages: Albești, Buimăceni, Coștiugeni, Jijia, Mășcăteni and Tudor Vladimirescu.

References

Communes in Botoșani County
Localities in Western Moldavia